The Huairou Reservoir is a reservoir in Huairou District, Beijing, China. It is located about 60 km north of central Beijing. It is the site of the Huairou Solar Observing Station.

References

Reservoirs in China
Huairou District